Wharfedale RUFC is a rugby union team which takes part in the fourth tier of the English league system. After twenty years in the third tier, Wharfedale was relegated from National League 1 in 2016. One of the smallest teams in the league, the club is located in the North Yorkshire village of Threshfield. Wharfedale operate four senior sides and twelve junior teams.

Honours
 North East 1 champions: 1987–88 
 North Division 2 champions: 1991–92
 North Division 1 champions: 1993–94
 Courage League Division 5 North champions: 1995–96
 Yorkshire Cup winners (3 times): 2010, 2013, 2014

Notable former players
 Andrew Baggett – fly-half who became all-time National League 1 points scorer with over 1,700 scored over 14 seasons with Wharfedale (2001–08) and Blaydon (2008–17).  Also capped by Yorkshire and Durham and was part of the Yorkshire side that won the 2008 Bill Beamont Cup.
 Mark Bedworth – fly-half who scored over 1,200 points for the club between 2005 and 2010.  Capped by England Counties XV and Durham.
 Andrew Hodgson – rugby league convert who played at centre.  He is one of the all-time try scorers in National League 1 with 95 tries.

Current standings

References

External links
 

English rugby union teams
Rugby clubs established in 1923
Sport in North Yorkshire
Wharfedale